Johan Unt (24 March 1876 Tarvastu Parish – 7 April 1930 Tallinn) was an Estonian military major general.

In 1901, he graduated from Vilnius Military School. He participated in World War I as part of the Russian Imperial Army. In 1918, during the German occupation, he organized the illegal Estonian Defence League. He participated in the Estonian War of Independence. In 1919–1920, he was the head of the Estonian Defence League. In 1920–1930, he was the commander of the Tallinn garrison.

On 4 April 1930, Unt was shot and mortally wounded by an unknown assassin on a Tallinn street. He died in hospital three days later. 

Awards:
 1924: Cross of Liberty.

References

1876 births
1930 deaths
Assassinated Estonian people
People from Viljandi Parish
People from Kreis Fellin
Estonian major generals
Imperial Russian Army officers
Russian military personnel of the Russo-Japanese War
Russian military personnel of World War I
Estonian military personnel of the Estonian War of Independence
Recipients of the Order of St. Vladimir, 4th class
Recipients of the Order of St. Anna, 2nd class
Recipients of the Order of St. Anna, 3rd class
Recipients of the Order of St. Anna, 4th class
Recipients of the Order of Saint Stanislaus (Russian), 2nd class
Recipients of the Order of Saint Stanislaus (Russian), 3rd class
Recipients of the Cross of Liberty (Estonia)
Recipients of the Order of Lāčplēsis, 2nd class
Order of the White Rose of Finland
Recipients of the Cross of Valour (Poland)